Jože Mehle (born 6 May 1980) is a Slovenian cross-country skier. He competed in the men's sprint event at the 2006 Winter Olympics.

References

1980 births
Living people
Slovenian male cross-country skiers
Olympic cross-country skiers of Slovenia
Cross-country skiers at the 2006 Winter Olympics
Skiers from Ljubljana